Wheatfield Soul is the fourth studio album by the Canadian rock band the Guess Who, released in March 1969. The album is notable for being the first full-length Guess Who album to feature Burton Cummings exclusively on lead vocals, without original lead singer Chad Allan. Featuring the US top 10 hit "These Eyes", it marked the beginning of the band's international success.

Release history
Wheatfield Soul was not a commercial success. "These Eyes" was released as a single. Wheatfield Soul is the group's first psychedelic LP that also focuses on British influenced pop and rock. An original version of "Friends of Mine" is on the Guess Who's posthumous compilation This Time Long Ago.

Added to the 2009 remastered CD version was "When Friends Fall Out," "Guess Who Blues," and "Of a Dropping Pin." This version of "When Friends Fall Out" never made it to any original, early Guess Who albums. A later re-recording appeared on American Woman.

Track listing

Original release
All songs written by Randy Bachman and Burton Cummings except where noted.

Side one
 "These Eyes" – 3:45
 "Pink Wine Sparkles in the Glass" – 2:13
 "I Found Her in a Star" (Cummings) – 2:36
 "Friends of Mine" – 10:04

Side two
 "When You Touch Me" (Bachman, Cummings, Rob Matheson) – 3:38
 "A Wednesday in Your Garden" (Bachman) – 3:20
 "Lightfoot" (Bachman, Cummings, Matheson) – 3:07
 "Love and a Yellow Rose" – 5:05
 "Maple Fudge" – 1:49
 "We're Coming to Dinner" – 2:43

2009 Remastered CD (IconoClassic ICON 1008)
 "These Eyes"
 "Pink Wine Sparkles in the Glass"
 "I Found Her in a Star"
 "Friends of Mine"
 "When You Touch Me"
 "A Wednesday in Your Garden"
 "Lightfoot" 
 "Love and a Yellow Rose" 
 "Maple Fudge" 
 "We're Coming to Dinner" 
 "When Friends Fall Out" – 3:17 (#75 Canada, July 1968)
 "Guess Who Blues" – 3:31
 "Of a Dropping Pin" – 3:24 (#97 Canada, December 1968)

Personnel
The Guess Who
Burton Cummings – lead vocals, rhythm guitar, keyboards, flute
Randy Bachman – lead guitar, backing vocals
Jim Kale – bass, backing vocals
Garry Peterson – drums

Production
Jack Richardson - producer
Ben McPeek - musical director
David Greene - engineer
Elliot Scheiner - engineer
CD Mastered by Bob Irwin at Sundazed Studios, Coxsackie, New York, and Vic Anesini at Sony Music Studios, New York City

Charts
Album

Singles

References

External links
 

1969 albums
The Guess Who albums
Albums produced by Jack Richardson (record producer)
RCA Victor albums